Naufal Azman  (born 10 July 1998) is a Singaporean professional footballer who plays as a forward for Singapore Premier League club Geylang International.

Naufal Azman started his career in Singapore with the Garena Young Lions FC in the then named Singapore first tier football league, Great Eastern-Hyundai Singapore Premier League, making his professional debut as a 19-year-old in the 85th minute as a substitute in a comfortable 2-0 home win against Hougang United FC back in 2018. In his debut season with the Garena Young Lions FC, he has netted 2 goals in 16 appearances, one of which was a right-footed shot against Albirex Niigata (S) FC in a 1:3 home loss and the other a header in a comfortable 2:1 away win against Hougang United FC where he played alongside Ikhsan Fandi in a 3-5-2 formation whereby Fandi Ahmad was manager in the 17/18 season.

In the 20/21 season, he signed for Hougang United FC. After making 16 Appearances for the  Cheetahs carrying more experience and potential to be fulfilled as a player, he then transferred to Balestier Khalsa FC as a free agent to continue his football journey.

Career statistics

Club

Notes

References

1998 births
Living people
Singaporean footballers
Association football midfielders
Singapore Premier League players
Hougang United FC players